This is an incomplete list of ships built by Hall, Russell & Company.

Flower-class Corvettes

754 HMS Marguerite (K54) 1940
755  1941
756 HMS Mignonette (K38) 1941
760 HMS Coriander (K183) 1941
761 HMS Loosestrife (K105) 1941; renamed Hallsevni

Island-class Patrol Vessels

960 FPV Jura 1973 sold and renamed Criscilla
962 FPV Westra 1974 (2005-2007 MV Robert Hunter;)
971  1976, sold 16 Dec 1993  and renamed BNS Shaheed Ruhul Amin
972 HMS Orkney (P299) 1977, sold 30 April 1999 and renamed TTS Nelson (CG20)
973 HMS Shetland (P298) 1977, sold 19 Feb 2003 and renamed 
974 HMS Guernsey (P297) 1977, sold Jan 2004 and renamed 
975 HMS Lindisfarne (P300) 1978, sold Jan 2004 and renamed 
983 HMS Anglesey (P277) 1979, sold 2002 and renamed 
984 HMS Alderney (P278) 1979, sold 2002 and renamed

Castle-class Patrol Vessels

985  1980. Sold to Bangladesh Navy, April 2010 as BNS Dhaleshwari and reclassified as corvette after upgradation.
986  1982. Sold to Bangladesh Navy, April 2010 as BNS Bijoy and reclassified as corvette after upgradation.

Hong Kong Patrol Craft (HKPC)

988 HMS Peacock (P239) 1983 (now )
989 HMS Plover (P240) 1984 (now )
990 HMS Starling (P241) 1984 (now )
991 HMS Swallow (P242) 1984 (now )
992 HMS Swift (P243) 1984 (now )

Mooring and Salvage Vessels

979  1979 torpedo retrieval
993  1985
994 RMAS Salmaid (A186) 1985
995 RMAS Salmaster (A187) 1986

Fisheries Research Vessels

846 MV Sir William Hardy (later Rainbow Warrior) 1955
899  1962
940  1968

Auxiliaries

931 MV Criscilla (Freezer Stern Trawler) 1966; renamed  1979

Round Table Class Admiralty Trawlers

??? HMT Sir Gareth (T227) 1942

Passenger

244  1887
723 St. Sunniva 1931
910 
911 
912 MV Columba 1964 (now )
963 St. Ola 1974
997 St. Sunniva 1987 (conversion of 1972 Djursland/Panther)

Cargo

    SS Collynie, 1892 - Steel collier schooner - Ship’s owner Mr Todd Moffatt, Aberdeen, Collision with SS Girnigoe and sunk approaching Aberdeen Harbour 3 May 1897.
773 SS Edenwood, 1943 – Constantine Lines, Middlesbrough
776 SS Avonwood, 1944 – Constantine Lines, Middlesbrough
781 SS Corfen, 1944 – William Cory & Sons
785 SS Firebeam, 1945 – Gas Light and Coke Company
788 SS Sir Joseph Swan, 1945 – London Power Company
750 SS Winga, 1957 – Glen & Company Ltd, Glasgow
856 MV Rona, 1956 – Colonial Sugar Refinery Co Ltd, Australia
857 MV Corsea, 1956 – William Cory & Sons
    MV Silver Harrier, 1970 – Colonial Sugar Refinery Co Ltd, Australia
949 MV Thameshaven, 1971 – the largest ship built in Aberdeen
1000 , 1989
 Seaforth Viscount, launched 8 July 1982 from the dry dock due to the construction of the covered slipway. Later renamed Far Viscount and is now the Cape Viscount.

Passenger/Cargo

852 MV Bonavista, 1956 - Canadian National Railway Co. for the Newfoundland coastal boat service
853 MV Nonia, 1956 - Canadian National Railway Co. for the Newfoundland coastal boat service
749 MV Earl of Zetland, 1939 - Ferry, floating restaurant since 1988

References

Ships built by Hall, Russell & Company
Hall